James E Lumsden (born August 25, 1952) is an American politician who has served in the Georgia House of Representatives from the 12th district since 2013.

References

1952 births
Living people
Republican Party members of the Georgia House of Representatives
21st-century American politicians